Quiet Music for Quiet People is a completely improvised project featuring Inga Liljeström on vocals. It was recorded over two nights in August 2006. It was an experiment in improvised ambient music.

Track listing
"Slowly Surfacing" - 6:37
"Everything Feels Real" - 5:19
"Fall" - 8:24
"Red Afternoon" - 5:15
"Strange Days" - 8:02
"Lost Highway" - 2:30
"Sleep Longer" - 5:14
"A Place Near the Mouth" - 3:58
"Lumen" - 11:23 
(includes hidden track)

References

2006 albums
Inga Liljeström albums